Brod is a surname. Notable people with the surname include:

 Alexander Brod (born 1969), Jewish-Russian human rights activist
 Harry Brod (1951-2017), American academic and gender studies scholar
 Henri Brod (1799–1839), French oboist, instrument builder and composer of the early Romantic Era
 Jack Brod (1909–2008), American businessman and innovator	
 Laura Brod (born 1971), American politician
 Max Brod (1884–1968), German-speaking Czech Jewish, later Israeli, author, composer, and journalist
 Menachem Brod, Israeli rabbi
 Sid Brod, (1899–1955), American assistant director 

Toponymic surnames
Jewish surnames
Czech-language surnames